The Morphinae are a subfamily of Nymphalidae butterflies that includes the morphos, the owl butterflies (Caligo), and related lineages. It is either considered a sister group of the Satyrinae, or disassembled and included therein.

Systematics

This group sometimes includes the monotypic (sub)tribe Biina, otherwise placed in the Brassolini.
This group is the subject of intense study and the following classification is subject to modification.

Listed alphabetically by tribe.

Tribe Amathusiini (sometimes considered a distinct subfamily Amathusiinae):
 15 genera, see tribe article

Tribe Brassolini (previously considered a distinct subfamily Brassolinae):
 18-19 genera, see tribe article

Tribe Morphini:
 Antirrhea
 Caerois
 Morpho

References

External links

 nearctica.com: Checklist of Nearctic Nymphalidae. Retrieved 2007-JUN-05.
 Markku Savela's Lepidoptera and some other life forms: Morphinae. Version of 2007-MAR-27. Retrieved 2007-JUN-05.
 TOL Note that here the tribes of Morphinae are now tribes of Satyrinae
 Neotropical Butterflies Brassolini are treated (ranked) as a subfamily Morphinae

 
-
Butterfly subfamilies